Takeoff! is by a 1980 collection of science fiction and fantasy short stories, pastiches, and parodies, by Randall Garrett.

Reception
Thrust called Garrett "one of the more under-rated writers in the field" of science fiction, noting that the collection features "Most of the odd little bits of his humorous writing".

Spider Robinson reviewed Takeoff! for Analog Science Fiction/Science Fact, and commented that "If you are a newcomer to or a very casual reader of SF, you may miss a lot of the jokes [...] but the well-read fan will find a lot of laughs here," and further noted that the illustrations by Kelly Freas are "as always, a joy."

Tom Easton likewise reviewed Takeoff! for Analog, praising it as "a collection of parodies, pastiches, reviews in verse, and groaners guaranteed to rouse at least a grin."

In Isaac Asimov's Science Fiction Magazine, Baird Searles noted that although "there are moments when Garrett descends to that level between freshman and junior, a lot of it is amusing even if I didn't do a lot of thigh slapping and gut busting."

Amazing Stories lauded it as "a delightful collection which people who know Randall Garrett have awaited for years," while Space Gamer/Fantasy Gamer stated that it "provide(s) an entertaining chance to enjoy some more works of a writer whose works are beginning to gain well deserved recognition as classics."

Reviews
Review by Donald M. Hassler (1986) in Fantasy Review, October 1986

References

1980 short story collections
Science fiction short story collections